MLHS may refer to:
 Manitowoc Lutheran High School, Manitowoc, Wisconsin, United States
 Medical Lake High School, Medical Lake, Washington, United States
 Milwaukee Lutheran High School, Milwaukee, Wisconsin, United States
 Mountain Lakes High School, Mountain Lakes, New Jersey, United States